The Phoenix Industries Sport is an American powered parachute that was designed and produced by Phoenix Industries of Southampton, New Jersey. Now out of production, when it was available the aircraft was supplied as in the form of plans for amateur construction. In addition to the plans the company also supplied materials kits and canopies.

Design and development

The Sport carriage is built from metal tubing. In flight steering is accomplished via foot levers that actuate the canopy brakes, creating roll and yaw.

The manufacturer estimated the construction time from the plans as 150 hours.

Specifications (Sport)

References

1990s United States ultralight aircraft
Single-engined pusher aircraft
Powered parachutes
Homebuilt aircraft
Phoenix Industries aircraft